Seashore can be any of the following:

Landform
 Coast
 Intertidal zone, between high and low water lines
 National seashore, a special designation in the United States
 Shore
 Beach

Other
 Seashore (software), an open source image editor, based on GIMP written in Cocoa for Mac OS X
 Carl Seashore, psychologist
 Seashore (film), a 2015 Brazilian film
 "Seashore", a song by The Regrettes from the album Feel Your Feelings Fool!